In mathematics, and more specifically, in the theory of fractal dimensions, Frostman's lemma provides a convenient tool for estimating the Hausdorff dimension of sets.

Lemma: Let A be a Borel subset of Rn, and let s > 0. Then the following are equivalent:
Hs(A) > 0, where Hs denotes the s-dimensional Hausdorff measure.
There is an (unsigned) Borel measure μ on Rn satisfying μ(A) > 0, and such that 
 
holds for all x ∈ Rn and r>0.

Otto Frostman proved this lemma for closed sets A as part of his PhD dissertation at Lund University in 1935. The generalization to Borel sets is more involved, and requires the theory of Suslin sets.

A useful corollary of Frostman's lemma requires the notions of the s-capacity of a Borel set A ⊂ Rn, which is defined by

(Here, we take inf ∅ = ∞ and  = 0.  As before, the measure  is unsigned.) It follows from Frostman's lemma that for Borel A ⊂ Rn

Web pages

Illustrating Frostman measures

Further reading
 

Dimension theory
Fractals
Metric geometry